Jeevana Jyothi is a 1987 Indian Kannada-language film, directed by P. Vasu and produced by Vijaya Shankar Bhat. The film stars Vishnuvardhan, Ambika, Nalini and Srinivasa Murthy. The film has musical score by Vijay Anand. The movie was dubbed into Malayalam, with the title Samarppanam.

Plot 
A girl is found murdered on a railway track.  A "Y" shaped mark is found on her body which can be due to leech bite. The story revolves around the people involved in the investigation of the murder. This include Chandrakanth Sharma, the police officer who investigates the murder, the forensic surgeon Sarvajaya who does the autopsy and Aravindan who is an ayurvedic practitioner. The story brings to light the insecurity faced by women. The story also revolves around the relationship between them and how the case affects their mental psychology with family affairs.

Cast

Vishnuvardhan
Ambika
Nalini
Sridhar
Srinivasa Murthy
Vijayaranjani
Dinesh
Rajanand
Shubha
Baby Sujitha
Mysore Lokesh
Sudheer

Soundtrack
The music was composed by Vijay Anand.

References

External links
 
 

1987 films
1980s Kannada-language films
Films directed by P. Vasu